Dance Fever is the fifth studio album by English indie rock band Florence and the Machine, released on 13 May 2022 by Polydor Records. Work on the album was originally scheduled for early 2020 in New York City; however, due to the COVID-19 pandemic, recording took place in London instead. Frontwoman Florence Welch has cited Iggy Pop as the biggest musical influence on the album; which features a variety of styles, ranging from progressive pop to indie pop, disco, and industrial music.

The title and concept of Dance Fever originated in Welch's fascination with choreomania, a social phenomenon in early modern Europe that involved groups of people dancing erratically. The album cover was photographed by Autumn de Wilde, who also filmed music videos for the album's three singles: "King", "My Love" and "Free", as well as the song "Heaven Is Here".

Dance Fever was a commercial success in Europe, the US and Oceania. It debuted atop the UK Albums Chart in the week of its release, becoming the band's fourth number-one album in their home country. It reached the second place in Australia, Belgium, Germany, Ireland, the Netherlands, New Zealand and Portugal and debuted in the top ten of several other record charts. The album received widespread critical acclaim from music critics and is ranked as the best-received album in the band's release history. Critics mainly praised the diversity of the sound, Welch's songwriting abilities and powerful vocals. To promote the album, Florence and the Machine will embark on the Dance Fever Tour which will visit cities in North America, Europe and Oceania.

Background and recording
The majority of the album was recorded in London. The first recording sessions for the album were originally scheduled to take place in March 2020 in New York City but were scrapped after the World Health Organization (WHO) declared COVID-19 a pandemic. While recording the "anthemic" Dance Fever, Welch and her collaborators fostered a "dance, folk, '70s Iggy Pop" sound in the vein of "Lucinda Williams or Emmylou Harris and more" that is meant to be enjoyed during "the return of clubs, live music and dancing at festivals". Welch also found inspiration in "the tragic heroines of pre-Raphaelite art, the gothic fiction of Carmen Maria Machado and Julia Armfield, the visceral wave of folk horror film from The Wicker Man" (1973) to the A24 films The Witch (2015) and Midsommar (2019), Francis Ford Coppola's Bram Stoker's Dracula (1992) was visually a big reference for the record and the costumes, and "folkloric elements of a moral panic from the Middle Ages".

The title of the album was inspired by Welch's fascination with choreomania, a social phenomenon in early modern Europe that involved groups of people dancing erratically.

Promotion

On 9 March 2022, Welch posted the album cover to her Instagram account in a post announcing the album's pre-order date. She described the album as "a fairytale in 14 songs" in the same post.

In early 2022, Florence and the Machine were confirmed to be headlining a series of summer music festivals, including the Madrid's Mad Cool. On 28 March 2022, Welch announced the Dance Fever Tour to support the album. The tour began on 2 September 2022 at Place Bell in Laval, Quebec, and is scheduled to conclude on 21 March 2023 at the Spark Arena in Auckland, New Zealand. A 24-track live album recorded during the band's 17 September 2022 concert at Madison Square Garden, entitled Dance Fever (Live at Madison Square Garden), was released on 14 October 2022.

Singles
On 21 February 2022, fans of the band received a medieval-styled card in the mail that featured a photo of Florence Welch dressed in period clothing. The card had the word "King" on it, and each envelope was inscribed with the wording "Florence + the Machine - Chapter 1" along its back. That same day, digital billboards began popping up around London that featured the same picture of Welch that was printed on the card. The band's website was also updated with fifteen cards, the first of which featuring the mailer's design. The single, titled "King" was digitally released on 23 February 2022 along with its accompanying music video. 

The first single was soon followed by the release of "Heaven Is Here", on 7 March. Music videos for both songs were shot in Kyiv shortly before Russia's invasion of Ukraine in February 2022.

The second single "My Love" and the third single "Free" were released on 10 March and 20 April, respectively. Welch dedicated the music video for "Free" to the people of Ukraine amidst the Russian invasion.

On 9 December 2022, a live version of "Morning Elvis" in a duet with Ethel Cain, recorded at the Ball Arena on 1 October 2022 during the Denver stop of the Dance Fever Tour, was released as a promotional single.

Composition

Dance Fever is a pop rock, baroque pop, progressive pop, alternative rock, gothic pop, and folk album with elements of indie pop, disco, electronic, psychedelic, industrial, spoken word, glam rock, easy listening, dance-pop, sunshine pop, EDM, folk rock, gospel, synth-pop, experimental, post-punk, jangle, and electropop.

Critical reception

Dance Fever received widespread acclaim from music critics. At Metacritic, which assigns a normalised rating out of 100 to reviews from mainstream publications, the album received an average score of 84, based on 17 reviews, indicating "universal acclaim", becoming the band's highest-scored album on the website to date. Writing for AllMusic, Neil Z. Yeung, gave the album four out of five stars and likened it to the band's previous releases Lungs (2009) and How Big, How Blue, How Beautiful (2015) in "emotional depth and uplifting power". He concluded his review by writing that the album marked "a generous offering to the goddesses of dance and restorative energy".

Sophia McDonald from Clash Music rated the album nine out of ten stars, labelling it "as majestic as it is authentic". She further praised it for its "self awareness" and deemed it "beautifully honest". Summarising the album as a whole, McDonald deemed it "[a] dance party to release your demons to, they [Florence and the Machine] cast yet another lyrically beautiful and musically capitulating spell."

Commercial performance
Dance Fever achieved wide commercial success across Europe. It debuted atop the UK Albums Chart, thus becoming the band's fourth number-one album in the country. The album achieved the feat with approximately 26,000 chart sales midweek during its release. Additionally, it debuted atop the Scottish Albums Chart in the week of 20 May 2022. 

Dance Fever achieved commercial success in the United States and Australia as well. In the US, the album debuted at number seven on the Billboard 200 albums chart, thus becoming the band's fourth top ten record in the country. It further reached the summit of the Top Alternative Albums and Top Rock Albums charts in the country. In Australia, Dance Fever debuted at number 2 on the ARIA Charts in its first week of release on 29 May 2022.

Track listing

Notes
  signifies an additional producer
  signifies a miscellaneous producer

Personnel
Florence and the Machine
 Florence Welch – vocals (all tracks), string arrangement (tracks 1, 2, 5, 6, 8, 11), percussion (2, 6, 9, 10), piano (2, 6), acoustic guitar (9), foot stamping (9, 12)
 Isabella Summers – background vocals
 Robert Ackroyd – electric guitar (13)
 Tom Monger – harp
 Cyrus Bayandor
 Aku Orraca-Tetteh – background vocals (3, 4, 6)
 Dionne Douglas
 Hazel Mills – background vocals
 Sam Doyle

Additional musicians

 Jack Antonoff – acoustic guitar (1–3, 5, 8), bass (1–6, 8), drums (1–6, 8, 13), Mellotron (1–4), percussion (1–3, 8), piano (1–4, 6), programming (1–3, 6, 9, 14), bells (2, 3), electric guitar (2, 3, 5), organ (2. 5, 8), 12-string acoustic guitar (3, 8), slide guitar (5, 13), synthesizer (5, 6, 8), tubular bells (8, 9), Wurlitzer organ (8)
 Evan Smith – saxophones (1, 3, 5), synthesizer (1)
 Tom Moth – harp, string arrangement (1, 2, 5, 6, 8, 11)
 Bobby Hawk – violin (1–4)
 Eric Byers – cello (2–4)
 Dave Bayley – electric guitar (2, 6, 7, 10–12, 14), strings (2, 11, 14), programming (5, 7, 9–12, 14), bells (6), percussion (6, 7, 11, 14), piano (6, 10, 11), synthesizer (6, 9, 10), bass (7, 10, 11, 14), organ (7, 12), acoustic guitar (10), drums (10, 11, 14), Mellotron (10, 14), keyboards (11)
 Thomas Bartlett – percussion (3), piano (3, 13), synthesizer (3, 4, 6, 13); accordion, drums, keyboards (13)
 Maggie Rogers – background vocals (5, 6)
 Leo Abrahams – acoustic guitar (6), electric guitar (6, 10, 14)
 Steve Pearce – bass (6)
 Ian Thomas – drums (6)
 Mark Brown – saxophone (6)
 Sally Herbert – string arrangement (6)
 Paul Burton – trombone (6)
 Joe Auckland – trumpet (6)
 Mikey Freedom Hart – acoustic guitar (7, 14); celesta, viola (7); falsetto, pedal steel guitar (14)
 Kid Harpoon – bass, drums, electric guitar, piano (8, 9); percussion (8)
 Chris Worsey – cello (11)
 Ian Burdge – cello (11)
 Everton Nelson – violin (11)
 Gillon Cameron – violin (11)
 Julia Singleton – violin (11)
 Kate Robinson – violin (11)
 Lucy Wilkins – violin (11)
 Marianne Haynes – violin (11)
 Natalia Bonner – violin (11)
 Nicky Sweeney – violin (11)
 Richard George – violin (11)
 Rick Koster – violin (11)

Technical

 Chris Gehringer – mastering
 Will Quinnell – mastering (2–14)
 Serban Ghenea – mixing (1–4, 6, 8, 10, 11)
 Jack Antonoff – mixing (5, 7, 9, 12, 13)
 Laura Sisk – mixing (5, 7, 9, 12, 13), engineering (1–6, 8, 9, 13), additional engineering (11, 14)
 David Wrench – mixing (14)
 Evan Smith – engineering (1–3, 5)
 Jon Gautier – engineering (1–4)
 Billy Halliday – engineering (5–14)
 David Hart – engineering (7)
 Jeremy Hatcher – engineering (8, 9)
 Pat Dillett – engineering (13)
 Mikey Freedom Hart – engineering (14)
 Bryce Bordone – mixing assistance (1, 3, 4, 6, 8, 10, 11)
 Dave Snyder – engineering assistance (1–6, 8, 9, 13, 14)
 Duncan Fuller – engineering assistance (1–6, 8, 10)
 John Rooney – engineering assistance (1–5, 8, 9, 11, 13, 14)
 Lauren Marquez – engineering assistance (1–6, 8, 9, 11, 13, 14)
 Matt Hall – engineering assistance (1–6, 8, 9, 13, 14)
 Megan Searl – engineering assistance (1–5)
 Ben Loveland – engineering assistance (6, 8, 10, 11, 14)
 Amy Sergeant – engineering assistance (7, 13)
 James Pinfield-Wells – engineering assistance (7, 13)
 Claude Vause – engineering assistance (12)

Charts

Weekly charts

Year-end charts

Certifications

References

External links

2022 albums
Albums produced by Jack Antonoff
Florence and the Machine albums
Polydor Records albums
Progressive pop albums
Albums postponed due to the COVID-19 pandemic
Folk albums by English artists
Gothic rock albums by English artists